Brian Anthony Robinson (born 22 November 1967) is an Australian cricketer, who played for Tasmania from 1993 until 1995. He was an off-break bowler.

References

External links

1967 births
Living people
Australian cricketers
Tasmania cricketers
People from Devonport, Tasmania
Cricketers from Tasmania